William Spry (January 11, 1864 – April 21, 1929) was an American politician who was the third Governor of the State of Utah. He is the namesake of the William Spry Agriculture Building that houses the Utah Department of Agriculture and Food.

Life and career
Spry was born at Windsor, Berkshire, England. He emigrated to Utah Territory with his parents at the age of eleven.

In 1885, Spry was called as an LDS Church missionary and went to serve in the Southern States Mission. From 1888 to 1891 (continuing his time from being a regular missionary), Spry served as president of the Southern States Mission. In 1890, during his mission, Spry received permission from the leaders of the church to return briefly to Salt Lake City where he married Mary Alice Wrathall.

In 1894, Spry was elected county collector in Tooele County, Utah. In 1902 Spry was elected to the Utah House of Representatives and in 1905 he was appointed one of the members of the Utah state board of land commissioners.  From 1906 to 1908, Spry served as United States Marshal for the District of Utah.

He served as governor of Utah from 1909 to 1917. He was a Republican. Spry was a strong opponent of Prohibition, and vetoed two bills that would have implemented this. In 1915, Spry refused President Woodrow Wilson's request to reconsider the impending execution of Joe Hill and allowed the execution to take place on November 19.

From 1921 to 1929 Spry served as commissioner of Public Lands. Spry died in Washington, D.C., in 1929 when he was still serving as the Federal Commissioner of Public Lands. He was buried at Salt Lake City Cemetery.

See also
List of U.S. state governors born outside the United States
Mount Spry, a mountain named in his honor

References

External links

|-

|-

|-

1864 births
1929 deaths
19th-century Mormon missionaries
American leaders of the Church of Jesus Christ of Latter-day Saints
American Mormon missionaries in the United States
Burials at Salt Lake City Cemetery
English emigrants to the United States
English Latter Day Saints
English leaders of the Church of Jesus Christ of Latter-day Saints
Farmers from Utah
General Land Office Commissioners
Republican Party governors of Utah
Republican Party members of the Utah House of Representatives
Mission presidents (LDS Church)
People from Tooele County, Utah
People from Windsor, Berkshire
United States Marshals
Latter Day Saints from Utah